Chennault House may refer to:

in the United States (by state)
 Chennault House (Danburg, Georgia), listed on the National Register of Historic Places (NRHP) in Lincoln County
Chennault House (Gilbert, Louisiana), listed on the NRHP in Franklin Parish

See also
 Chenault House (disambiguation)